Cătălin Valentin Bucur (born 25 March 1983) is a Romanian former football forward. Bucur is the product of Gloria Bistrița football academy. His best period as a player was between 2008 and 2011 when he scored 27 goals for Bihor Oradea and Arieșul Turda in Liga II.

References

External links
 
 
 Cătălin Bucur at fupa.net

1983 births
Living people
Sportspeople from Bistrița
Romanian footballers
Association football forwards
Liga I players
Liga II players
ACF Gloria Bistrița players
CSM Câmpia Turzii players
FC Bihor Oradea players
ACS Sticla Arieșul Turda players
FC UTA Arad players
Romanian expatriate footballers
Expatriate footballers in Germany
Romanian expatriate sportspeople in Germany
21st-century Romanian people